is a Japanese idol group produced by Yasushi Akimoto. It was created on February 21, 2018. It is Nogizaka46's second sister group, after Keyakizaka46 (now split between Sakurazaka46 and Hinatazaka46). This was named after the Osaka-based entertainment company, Yoshimoto Kogyo Holdings.

History
On February 21, 2018, the Sakamichi Series wanted to make a third overall group that will change idol history, with its unisex concept that fits all genders and ages with not just only the usual musical acts, but also with Owarai comedy concept.

On October 29, 2021, it was announced the group would go on hiatus after a concert at Zepp Haneda on February 5, 2022.

Members

Generation 1

Generation 2 
 Tokio Uenishi
 Asami Osako
 Yoshio Obara
 Hayate Kajiwara
 Madoka Kabasawa
 Kosuke Kikuchi
 Miyu Kihara
 Junichi Sakamoto
 Masafumi Satake
 Sota Yamamoto
 Kazushi Toguchi
 Tojima Repeat
 Hirota Hara
 Ruruka Higa
 Renge Fujimori
 Keiko Matsuura
 Maruirui
 Kana Minosako
 Rossy

Former members

Discography

Studio albums

Singles

References

External links 
  

 
Japanese idol groups
Sakamichi Series